KNLX (104.9 FM, "New Life 104.9") is a commercial radio station allocated to serve Prineville, Oregon, United States. The station, which began regular broadcasting in 2008, is currently owned by Cowan Broadcasting LLC.  The KNLX signal also covers the metropolitan area of Bend, Oregon; in addition, New Life Radio also has another radio station, KNLR, in Bend Oregon.

Programming
KNLX broadcasts a Contemporary Christian music and teaching format. KNLX programming is a simulcast of sister station KNLR except from 11:00 AM to 1:00 PM when KNLX airs The Dave Ramsey Show.

History
This station received its original construction permit from the Federal Communications Commission on June 9, 2005.  The new station was assigned the call letters KWDP by the FCC on March 29, 2006.

In February 2008, Horizon Christian Fellowship reached an agreement to transfer the construction permit to Cowan Broadcasting LLC.  The transfer was approved by the FCC on April 18, 2008, and the transaction was consummated on April 30, 2008.  During the sale, the station applied to the FCC for new call letters and the station was assigned the current KNLX call letters by the FCC on April 10, 2008.

The station's second application for a license to cover was accepted for filing on July 7, 2008.  , the Commission has taken no further action on this license application, pending a licensing issue with KRSK (105.1 FM) in Salem, Oregon.

References

External links
KNLX official website

Contemporary Christian radio stations in the United States
Radio stations established in 2008
Prineville, Oregon
2005 establishments in Oregon
NLX